Virginia Lawrence (Parker) Clagett (born 18 Jul 1943) is an American politician from Maryland and a member of the Democratic Party. She served in the Maryland House of Delegates, representing Maryland's District 30 in Anne Arundel County, until her 4th term ended in December 2010.  A proven vote-getter for decades, she lost re-election in November 2010 to Delegate Herbert H. McMillan.  Clagett is a member of the Marlborough Hunt Club, a local Fox Hunt in Southern Maryland .

Personal life 

Virginia Lawrence Parker graduated from Potomac School, Madeira School, and Smith College. Clagett married attorney Brice McAdoo Clagett on September 18, 1968. In 1968, they bought Holly Hill, a house in Friendship, Maryland  that was built by Brice Clagett's ancestors more than three centuries prior. They had two children: John Brice de Treville Clagett and Ann Calvert Brooke Clagett. They later divorced.

Career

Legislative Notes
 voted in favor of the Tax Reform Act of 2007 (HB2)
 voted in favor of in-state tuition for students who attended Maryland high schools for at least 2 years. (2007) (HB6)
 voted for the Maryland Gang Prosecution Act of 2007 (HB713), subjecting gang members to up to 20 years in prison and/or a fine of up to $100,000
 voted for Jessica's Law (HB 930), eliminating parole for the most violent child sexual predators and creating a mandatory minimum sentence of 25 years in state prison, 2007
 voted for Public Safety – Statewide DNA Database System – Crimes of Violence and Burglary – Post conviction (HB 370), helping to give police officers and prosecutors greater resources to solve crimes and eliminating a backlog of 24,000 unanalyzed DNA samples, leading to 192 arrests, 2008
 voted for Vehicle Laws – Repeated Drunk and Drugged Driving Offenses – Suspension of License (HB 293), strengthening Maryland's drunk driving laws by imposing a mandatory one year license suspension for a person convicted of drunk driving more than once in five years, 2009
 voted for HB 102, creating the House Emergency Medical Services System Workgroup, leading to Maryland's budgeting of $52 million to fund three new Medevac helicopters to replace the State's aging fleet, 2009

For the past four years, Delegate Claggett has annually voted to support classroom teachers, public schools, police and hospitals in Anne Arundel County. Since 2002, funding to schools across the State has increased 82%, resulting in Maryland being ranked top in the nation for K-12 education.

In 2010 Del. Clagett had one of the highest lodging records in the state (almost $11,000) despite the fact that Annapolis is in her District.

Election results 
2010 Race for Maryland House of Delegates – 30th District
Voters to choose three:
{| class="wikitable"
|-
!Name
!Votes
!Percent
!Outcome
|-
|- 
|Ronald A. George, Rep.
|25,631
|  19.25%
|   Won
|-
|-
|Michael E. Busch, Dem.
|23,995
|  18.02%
|   Won
|-
|-
|Herb McMillan, Rep.
|22,553
|  16.94%
|   Won
|-
|-
|Virginia P. Clagett, Dem.
|21,142
|  15.88%
|   Lost
|-
|-
|Seth Howard, Rep.
|20,080
|  15.08%
|   Lost
|-
|-
|Judd Legum, Dem.
|19,670
|  14.77%
|   Lost
|-
|Other Write-Ins
|89
|  0.07%
|   
|-
|}

2006 Race for Maryland House of Delegates – 30th District
Voters to choose three:
{| class="wikitable"
|-
!Name
!Votes
!Percent
!Outcome
|-
|- 
|Michael E. Busch, Dem.
|22,479
|  17.1%
|   Won
|-
|-
|Virginia P. Clagett, Dem.
|22,360
|  17.0%
|   Won
|-
|-
|Ronald A. George, Rep.
|21,811
|  16.6%
|   Won
|-
|-
|Barbara Samorajczyk, Dem.
|21,758
|  16.5%
|   Lost
|-
|-
|Andy Smarick, Rep.
|20,594
|  15.6%
|   Lost
|-
|-
|Ron Elfenbein, Rep.
|20,457
|  15.5%
|   Lost
|-
|-
|David Whitney, Con.
|2,225
|  1.7%
|   Lost
|-
|Other Write-Ins
|80
|  0.1%
|   
|-
|}

2002 Race for Maryland House of Delegates – 30th District
Voters to choose three:
{| class="wikitable"
|-
!Name
!Votes
!Percent
!Outcome
|-
|- 
|Michael E. Busch, Dem.
|22,422
|  17.7%
|   Won
|-
|-
|Virginia P. Clagett, Dem.
|21,875
|  17.3%
|   Won
|-
|-
|Herbert H. McMillan, Rep.
|20,972
|  16.6%
|   Won
|-
|-
|C. Richard D'Amato, Dem.
|20,545
|  16.3%
|   Lost
|-
|-
|Michael Collins, Rep.
|19,140
|  15.1%
|   Lost
|-
|-
|Nancy Almgren, Rep.
|18,861
|  14.9%
|   Lost
|-
|-
|David M. Gross, Green
|2,536
|  2.0%
|   Lost
|-
|Other Write-Ins
|71
|  0.1%
|   
|-
|}

1998 Race for Maryland House of Delegates – District 30
Voters to choose three:
{| class="wikitable"
!Name
!Votes
!Percent
!Outcome
|-
|-
|-
|Michael E. Busch, Dem.
|24,075
|  21%
|   Won
|-
|-
|Virginia P. Clagett, Dem.
|24,036
|  21%
|   Won
|-
|-
|Richard D'Amato, Dem.
|20,223
|  18%
|   Won
|-
|-
|Phillip D. Bissett, Rep.
|18,690
|  16%
|   Lost
|-
|-
|Edward J. Turner, Rep.
|14,119
|  12%
|   Lost
|-
|-
|Anthony McConkey, Rep.
|12,353
|  11%
|   Lost
|}

1994 Race for Maryland House of Delegates – District 30
Voters to choose three:
{| class="wikitable"
!Name
!Votes
!Percent
!Outcome
|-
|-
|-
|Michael E. Busch, Dem.
|18,709
|  19%
|   Won
|-
|-
|Phillip D. Bissett, Rep.
|18,009
|  23%
|   Won
|-
|-
|Virginia P. Clagett, Dem.
|18,254
|  18%
|   Won
|-
|-
|Ralph C. Rosacker, Rep.
|16,299
|  16%
|   Lost
|-
|-
|Joan Beck, Rep.
|15,974
|  16%
|   Lost
|-
|-
|John C. Eldridge Jr., Dem.
|13,320
|  13%
|   Lost
|}

References

Democratic Party members of the Maryland House of Delegates
Living people
1943 births
Women state legislators in Maryland
Members of Anne Arundel County Council
21st-century American politicians
21st-century American women politicians